Massachusetts State Militia Aviation Camp was an encampment of the Massachusetts Naval Air Militia that existed on Great Misery Island in Salem, Massachusetts from 1916 to 1917.

See also
 List of military installations in Massachusetts

References

Salem, Massachusetts
Military facilities in Massachusetts